The following is a list of mayors of Monaco.

References

 
Monaco
Politics of Monaco
Government of Monaco
Lists of Monegasque people
Mayors